Lodgepole is a village in Cheyenne County, Nebraska, United States. The population was 318 at the 2010 census.

History
Lodgepole was founded in 1867 when the Union Pacific Railroad was extended to that point. It took its name from Lodgepole Creek, where it was assumed the Native Americans had cut trees to make poles for their lodges.

Geography
Lodgepole is located at  (41.148472, -102.638791).

Climate

Demographics

2010 census
As of the census of 2010, there were 318 people, 157 households, and 95 families residing in the village. The racial makeup of the village was 98.1% White, 0.9% from other races, and 0.9% from two or more races. Hispanic or Latino of any race were 4.4% of the population.

There were 157 households, of which 19.7% had children under the age of 18 living with them, 48.4% were married couples living together, 5.7% had a female householder with no husband present, 6.4% had a male householder with no wife present, and 39.5% were non-families. 35.7% of all households were made up of individuals, and 17.2% had someone living alone who was 65 years of age or older. The average household size was 2.03 and the average family size was 2.56.

The median age in the village was 50.6 years. 17.3% of residents were under the age of 18; 2.8% were between the ages of 18 and 24; 21.1% were from 25 to 44; 37.7% were from 45 to 64; and 21.1% were 65 years of age or older. The gender makeup of the village was 53.5% male and 46.5% female.

2000 census
As of the census of 2000, there were 348 people, 158 households, and 102 families residing in the village. The population density was 738.1 people per square mile (285.9/km2). There were 188 housing units at an average density of 398.7 per square mile (154.4/km2). The racial makeup of the village was 99.14% White, 0.57% Native American and 0.29% Asian. Hispanic or Latino of any race were 3.45% of the population.

There were 158 households, out of which 22.2% had children under the age of 18 living with them, 53.8% were married couples living together, 8.9% had a female householder with no husband present, and 35.4% were non-families. 32.9% of all households were made up of individuals, and 20.3% had someone living alone who was 65 years of age or older. The average household size was 2.20 and the average family size was 2.75.

In the village, the population was spread out, with 20.4% under the age of 18, 7.8% from 18 to 24, 22.1% from 25 to 44, 26.4% from 45 to 64, and 23.3% who were 65 years of age or older. The median age was 45 years. For every 100 females, there were 102.3 males. For every 100 females age 18 and over, there were 87.2 males.

As of 2000 the median income for a household in the village was $27,386, and the median income for a family was $33,516. Males had a median income of $26,667 versus $16,944 for females. The per capita income for the village was $16,147. About 11.1% of families and 12.5% of the population were below the poverty line, including 12.8% of those under age 18 and 14.4% of those age 65 or over.

References

Villages in Cheyenne County, Nebraska
Villages in Nebraska